Zamboni is an Italian surname. Notable people with the surname include:

Adriano Zamboni (1933–2005), Italian racing cyclist
Anteo Zamboni (1911–1926), Italian anarchist and anti-fascist
Dario Simões Zamboni (born 1975), Brazilian biologist 
Frank Zamboni (1901–1988), American inventor of the ice resurfacing machine
Giovanni Zamboni, Baroque composer 
Giovanni Fortunato Zamboni, Roman priest and founder in 1801 of the Pontificia Accademia di Religione Cattolica in Rome
Giuseppe Zamboni (1776–1846), Roman Catholic priest and physicist 
Joan Zamboni (1933–2017), American ice dancer 
Luigi Zamboni (1767–1837), Italian operatic buffo bass-baritone
Marco Zamboni (born 1977), Italian soccer player
Maria Zamboni (1895–1976), Italian singer
Massimo Zamboni (born 1957), Italian guitarist who co-founded the band CCCP Fedeli alla linea
Matteo Zamboni (active early 18th century), Italian painter, active in Emilia-Romagna
Paolo Zamboni (born 1957), Italian doctor and vascular surgeon
Paolo Zamboni (1939-1969), Italian athlete
Sandro Luís Zamboni Britzke (born 1978), Brazilian former football player
William C. Zamboni (1872-1931), American businessman and politician
 

Italian-language surnames